Filipe Manuel Nunes Brigues (born 24 July 1990) is a Portuguese footballer who plays for F.C. Alverca as a right-back.

Club career
Born in Alcácer do Sal, Setúbal District, Brigues joined the youth system of local club Vitória F.C. at the age of 10. On 19 April 2009 he made the first of three Primeira Liga appearances with the team, coming on as a half-time substitute in a 0–4 home loss against S.L. Benfica.

Released in June 2011, Brigues competed exclusively in the third division for seven years. The 28-year-old returned to the top flight for the 2018–19 season, signing a two-year contract with G.D. Chaves.

References

External links

1990 births
Living people
Sportspeople from Setúbal District
Portuguese footballers
Association football defenders
Primeira Liga players
Liga Portugal 2 players
Segunda Divisão players
Vitória F.C. players
C.D. Santa Clara players
S.C. Farense players
União Montemor players
U.D. Leiria players
C.D. Mafra players
G.D. Chaves players
S.C. Olhanense players
U.D. Vilafranquense players
Louletano D.C. players
F.C. Alverca players